Dr. Victor Fries, commonly known as Mr. Freeze, is a fictional character who appears in Joel Schumacher's 1997 superhero film Batman & Robin. Based upon the DC Comics character and supervillain of the same name, he was played by Austrian-American actor Arnold Schwarzenegger. In direct contrast to previous Batman films, Schwarzenegger received top billing ahead of George Clooney, the actor who portrayed the eponymous character.

Character arc
Dr. Victor Fries is a cryogenicist who puts his wife Nora in cryogenic stasis until he finds a cure for MacGregor's Syndrome, the (fictional) terminal illness she suffers from. During an experiment, he accidentally falls into a vat of sub-zero degree coolant, rendering him dependent on a diamond-powered sub-zero suit to survive. Batman (George Clooney) reveals that Nora has the most advanced stages of MacGregor's Syndrome, for which Mr. Freeze has yet to find a cure. 

Mr. Freeze crashes a charity event held by Wayne Enterprises and steals a diamond from the event. Batman and Robin (Chris O'Donnell) apprehend Mr. Freeze, who is imprisoned in Arkham Asylum. Soon afterward, however, Poison Ivy (Uma Thurman) and Bane (Robert Swenson) help him escape so he can assist them in their plan to turn Gotham City into a giant polar ice cap. 

Poison Ivy cuts off Nora's life support and deceives Mr. Freeze into thinking that Batman was responsible. A heartbroken Mr. Freeze swears revenge on the entire world, and begins planning to kill Batman. With the use of a gigantic ray gun stationed in an observatory, he freezes over the entire city. In a subsequent fight with Batman, Mr. Freeze destroys the observatory with a set of bombs (planted by Bane) in an unsuccessful attempt to commit suicide and take Batman with him. Batman shows Mr. Freeze a recording of Poison Ivy in which she brags about killing Nora, and tells him that his wife is not dead; she was restored and would be moved to Arkham, where he can complete his research. Batman asks him for the cure he created for the first stage of MacGregor's Syndrome to help his butler Alfred Pennyworth (Michael Gough), who is stricken with the disease; Mr. Freeze atones for his crimes by giving Batman the medicine he had developed. Freeze is then imprisoned in Arkham, where he promises to make his cellmate Poison Ivy's life "a living hell" while his own cell is in the process to be modified for his laboratory needs.

Background
Ed Harris, Anthony Hopkins, and Patrick Stewart were considered for the role, before the script was rewritten to accommodate the casting of Schwarzenegger. Regarding the look of the character, Schumacher decided that Mr. Freeze should be "big and strong like he was chiseled out of a glacier". 

Schwarzenegger was paid a $25 million salary for the role. His prosthetic makeup and wardrobe took six hours to apply each day. The Mr Freeze armor suit was made by armorer Terry English, who estimated the costume cost some $1.5 million to develop and make. To prepare for the role, Schwarzenegger wore a bald cap after declining to shave his head and wore a blue LED in his mouth. Crist Ballas helped supply his prosthetic makeup as he had done in another Schwarzenegger film, Jingle All the Way, and would do again in three more: End of Days, The 6th Day, and Collateral Damage. John Dykstra hired Flash Film Works for work on Batman and Robin, creating a digital matte painting of an ice-laden Gotham City, as well as performing some rig and wire removal work on the film.

Chris O'Donnell said that despite hanging out with Schwarzenegger a lot off set and during promotion for the film, they never worked a single day together; this was achieved with stand-ins when one of the actors was not available. Daniel Beretta dubbed for Schwarzenegger in the French version of Batman & Robin. Meanwhile, Anil Datt dubbed for Schwarzenegger in the Hindi language and Tesshō Genda dubbing in Japanese. 

The planned ending for the Batman: The Animated Series episode "Heart of Ice" was to have a weeping Freeze in his cell, with his tears freezing and turning into snowflakes. Bruce Timm and Paul Dini mentioned that if they could go back and do any episode again, they would do "Heart of Ice" and would include this. The effect was, however, used in Batman and Robin.

Reception
The character's penchant for cold- and ice-related puns was noted by critics. Roger Ebert of the Chicago Sun-Times criticized the toyetic approach and Mr. Freeze's one-liner jokes in his "thumbs down" review of the film. James Berardinelli of ReelViews commented that "Schwarzenegger, aside from looking like a cross between the Michelin Man and RoboCop, appears totally confused about what he's doing. Sometimes he's in Terminator mode; on other occasions, he's chomping on a cigar like he's back in Last Action Hero". He also noted that Freeze's backstory and motivation were "too complex for Schwarzenegger to convey effectively or for [director Joel] Schumacher to care about exploring. As a result, Mr. Freeze ends up being a frustratingly incomplete brute who's out to smother Gotham City under a blanket of ice." Robin Dougherty of Salon lamented that "Schwarzenegger’s exuberance is pinned down. He’s like a moth squashed by an 18-wheeler. He’s also paralyzed by amazingly inert dialogue. How many lame jokes about cold can you fit into two hours? Buy a ticket and find out." 

Alicia Silverstone won the Razzie Award for Worst Supporting Actress. Other nominations at the Razzie Awards included Schumacher (Worst Director), George Clooney and Chris O'Donnell (Worst Screen Couple), Akiva Goldsman (Worst Screenplay), both Chris O'Donnell and Arnold Schwarzenegger (Worst Supporting Actor), Uma Thurman (Worst Supporting Actress), as well as Billy Corgan (Worst Song for "The End Is the Beginning Is the End"). Batman & Robin also received nominations for Worst Picture, Worst Remake or Sequel and Worst Reckless Disregard for Human Life and Public Property.

TV Guide praised the 1998 direct-to-video superhero animated feature film Batman & Mr. Freeze: SubZero for being "more enjoyable — and far less campy — than Joel Schumacher's first two live action Batman movies." In addition, the magazine stated that "Though clearly aimed at kids, there's also plenty to keep adult viewers entertained, not the least of which are the amusingly curvaceous drawings of several dishy dames and the exaggerated muscularity of Batman & Robin."

Legacy
Several Six Flags amusement parks introduced new roller coasters themed to the film. Batman & Robin: The Chiller opened at Six Flags Great Adventure in 1997, and Mr. Freeze opened at both Six Flags Over Texas and Six Flags St. Louis in 1998. Mr. Freeze was planned to open in May 1997 to coincide with the release of Batman & Robin. Arnold Schwarzenegger and George Clooney were scheduled to appear at the opening of Gotham City at Six Flags Over Texas and be the first to ride it, but problems with the launch system delayed its opening to 1998. During Mr. Freeze's test runs, the LIM motors had issues with overheating and Six Flags officials could not provide the full thrust necessary to operate the ride consistently at high speeds. Park management wasn't concerned, as Flight of Fear at Kings Dominion in Virginia also had issues with the launch system. One of Mr. Freeze's trains suffered damage when the launch system closed onto the fins. The train was removed for adjustments and was later put back in place.

There were worries within Warner Bros. surrounding the negative critical reception of Batman & Robin and how it could come to harm the success of the subsequent direct-to-video animated film Batman & Mr. Freeze: SubZero, which was originally planned for release at around the same time as Batman & Robin but was subsequently delayed. SubZero received a far stronger positive response from critics than Batman & Robin, with Mr. Freeze's role within it being seen in a much more positive light, returning his popularity as a Batman villain to a level comparable to that reached by him within the two Emmy-winning episodes the character featured in of Batman: The Animated Series.

Mr. Freeze appears as a playable character in Lego Batman 3: Beyond Gotham, voiced by Liam O'Brien impersonating the Arnold Schwarzenegger version from Batman & Robin. He first appears as a boss in the story, on which the player helps Plastic Man defeat him in the Watchtower so that they can proceed to defeat Brainiac. The player as Batman in his Sensor-suit must attack Mr. Freeze while the character is in stealth mode. Mr. Freeze is later found in Qward in a side-quest where he requests the player to find another fuel cell for his freezer after the other was damaged by Killer Moth. The Batman Beyond version of Mr. Freeze is also playable via downloadable content.

In the animated series Harley Quinn, Freeze is served by ice skating masked henchmen, who wield hockey sticks, similar to the Freeze thugs in the movie.

The Batman & Robin version of Mr. Freeze appears in Space Jam: A New Legacy. He is among the Warner Bros. Serververse characters that watch the basketball match between the Tune Squad and the Goon Squad.

See also
Pamela Isley (Batman & Robin)

References

External links

Action film villains
Arnold Schwarzenegger
Batman (1989 film series)
Batman live-action film characters
DC Comics male supervillains
DC Comics scientists
Fictional Austrian people
Fictional characters with ice or cold abilities
Fictional chemical engineers
Fictional inventors
Fictional life scientists
Fictional mass murderers
Fictional mad scientists
Fictional physicians
Fictional physicists
Fictional scientists in films
Film characters introduced in 1997
Film supervillains
Male film villains